The First Presbyterian Church Cemetery is a historic churchyard cemetery of the First Presbyterian Church in Morristown, New Jersey, United States. The cemetery was added to the National Register of Historic Places, listed as a contributing property to the Morristown District, on October 30, 1973.

History
The oldest internments date to 1731. There is a mass gravesite for about 150 soldiers of the American Revolutionary War who died from smallpox in 1777.

Notable burials
 Samuel Beach Axtell (1819–1891), U.S. Congressman, Governor of Utah and New Mexico
 Silas Condict (1738–1801), delegate to the Continental Congress
 John Doughty (1754–1826), Revolutionary War Continental Army Officer
 Jacob Ford Sr. (1704–1777), iron manufacturer, politician and judge
 Jacob Ford Jr. (1738–1777) and Theodosia Ford (1741–1824), owners of the Ford Mansion, used by General Washington during the Revolutionary War
 Jonas P. Phoenix (1788–1859), US Congressman
 George Vail (1809–1875), represented  in the United States House of Representatives from 1853 to 1857.

See also
 List of cemeteries in New Jersey
 National Register of Historic Places listings in Morris County, New Jersey

References

External links
 
 
 

Morristown, New Jersey
Cemeteries in Morris County, New Jersey
Presbyterian cemeteries in the United States
Cemeteries on the National Register of Historic Places in New Jersey
Historic district contributing properties in New Jersey
Historic district contributing properties in Morris County, New Jersey